Weary Blues (also referred to as The Weary Blues) is an album by the American poet Langston Hughes, who recites several of his poems over jazz accompaniment composed and arranged by Leonard Feather and Charles Mingus. The album was recorded on March 17 & 18, 1958 in New York and was released on the MGM label in 1959. It was later reissued on Verve Records.

On side 1 (track 1) of the album Hughes is backed by a Leonard Feather organized group that includes Henry "Red" Allen, Sam "The Man" Taylor, Vic Dickenson, Milt Hinton, and Osie Johnson. On side 2 (tracks 2 and 3) the accompaniment is by a Charles Mingus led group that includes Horace Parlan, Shafi Hadi, and Jimmy Knepper.

Reception

The AllMusic review by Michael Katz called it "interesting, but not essential".

Track listing
 "Blues Montage: Opening Blues/Blues Montage/Commercial Theater/Morning After/Could Be/Testament"     
 "Consider Me: The Stranger/Midnight Stroll/Backstage    
 "Dream Montage: Weird Nightmare/Double G Train/Jump Monk

Personnel
Langston Hughes - narrator (all songs)
Track 1: 
Leonard Feather - arranger 
Red Allen - trumpet 
Vic Dickenson - trombone
Sam "The Man" Taylor - tenor saxophone, clarinet 
Al Williams - piano 
Milt Hinton - bass 
Osie Johnson - drums

Tracks 2 and 3: 
Charles Mingus - bass, arranger 
Jimmy Knepper - trombone
Shafi Hadi - tenor saxophone 
Horace Parlan - piano 
Kenny Dennis - drums

References

1959 albums
MGM Records albums
Charles Mingus albums
Langston Hughes albums